Mass Nerder is the seventh album by the punk rock band All. It was released on Epitaph Records in 1998.

Background and recording
In mid 1996, All began working on their next, then untitled, studio album. At the same time, Milo Aukerman was considering to permanently reunite the Descendents, and was beginning sessions for the band's next album Everything Sucks. All joined Aukerman on the sessions, where they played demos of the Descendants' songs. Price and Aukerman then split the album in two and took turns picking songs for Everything Sucks or Mass Nerder. The band recorded a total of 18 tracks for the new album, of which only four ("Vida Blue," "Silence," "Until Then" and "Good As My Word") would make it onto Mass Nerder. Nine other tracks ("Everything Sux," "I'm the One," "Sick-O-Me," "Caught," "When I Get Old," "She Loves Me," "Hateful Notebook," "I Won't Let Me" and "Thank You") were covers of songs from Everything Sucks, while the remaining five were left off Mass Nerder. As a result, Price wrote twelve completely new songs in 1996–97. "Silence," originally chosen by Aukerman, was intended to be sung as a duet with Price, but was ultimately given to All before Everything Sucks was finished.

Mass Nerder was finally recorded at The Blasting Room, in Fort Collins, Colorado between December 1997 and January 1998. Producer duties were handled by drummer Bill Stevenson, guitarist Stephen Egerton and Jason Livermore, all of whom would engineer and mix the sessions.

Track listing

Personnel
Personnel per booklet.

All
 Chad Price – vocals
 Bill Stevenson – drums
 Karl Alvarez – bass guitar, vocals
 Stephen Egerton – guitar

Additional musician
 Milo Aukerman – backing vocals

Production
 Bill Stevenson – producer, engineer, mixing
 Stephen Egerton – producer, engineer, mixing
 Jason Livermore – producer, engineer, mixing

References

External links

Mass Nerder at YouTube (streamed copy where licensed)

All (band) albums
1998 albums
Epitaph Records albums
Albums produced by Bill Stevenson (musician)